Gaggi may refer to:

People
 Alice Gaggi (born 1987), Italian mountain runner
 Anthony Gaggi (1925–1988), American criminal
 Enzo Gaggi (born 1998), Argentinian football player

Places
 Gaggi, Sicily, Italy